Sir Sydney Brookes Chapman (17 October 1935 – 9 October 2014) was a British Conservative politician and architect who served as Member of Parliament (MP) for Birmingham Handsworth and Chipping Barnet.

Life
Chapman was educated at Rugby School and Manchester University, where he studied architecture, gaining his Diploma in 1958 and ARIBA in 1960.  He was Chairman of the Young Conservatives from 1964 to 1966.

He married his first wife, Claire in 1976 (she was also his secretary when he was an MP), and they had three children. In 2005, he married his second wife, Teresa at Chelsea Town Hall.

After his retirement from politics, he moved from Barnet to Oxfordshire.
He was a vice-chairman of the Council of Christians and Jews and on the Council of the Royal Institute of British Architects for 2009–2012.

Chapman died on 9 October 2014 in Oxfordshire. A Service of Thanksgiving was organised by his family on 10 June 2015 at St Margaret's Church, Westminster. Attended by some 400 people including family, former colleagues, friends and constituents, the eulogies were read by Lord Ryder, Philip Porter and Chapman's sister, Cllr Christine Bateson.

Political career
Chapman first stood for Parliament, unsuccessfully, at Stalybridge and Hyde at the 1964 election, but was defeated by the incumbent Labour MP Fred Blackburn.

He was first elected to Parliament in 1970 as MP for Birmingham Handsworth, but lost his seat when Labour returned to power at the February 1974 general election.  During this period he was notable for Plant A Tree In '73, an initiative which had the support of Edward Heath's government and led to the formation of The Tree Council.

Five years later, at the 1979 election, Chapman was returned as MP for Chipping Barnet. The seat had previously been vacant, following the death of incumbent MP, former cabinet minister Reginald Maudling, three months before the election.  He was briefly a whip during John Major's administration, one of his principal tasks being to provide Queen Elizabeth II with daily reports of Parliamentary proceedings. His conscientious attention to this role led to his being knighted in 1995. Chapman was a member of the Parliamentary Assembly of the Council of Europe from 1997 to 2005.

Local achievements
In the late 1980s, following the death of a horse rider crossing the A1 trunk road in Arkley, Chapman championed the campaign to have a bridge put in for walkers, riders and cyclists' use.  This campaign was successful, and the bridge opened in 1991. In recognition of his work, he was presented with an award by the British Horse Society's President at the bridge's official opening ceremony.

Notes

References

Further reading

External links 

Sir Sydney Chapman Photograph, 2006

1935 births
2014 deaths
Conservative Party (UK) MPs for English constituencies
UK MPs 1970–1974
UK MPs 1979–1983
UK MPs 1983–1987
UK MPs 1987–1992
UK MPs 1992–1997
UK MPs 1997–2001
UK MPs 2001–2005
Associates of the Royal Institute of British Architects
People educated at Rugby School
Alumni of the University of Manchester
Architects from Cheshire
Knights Bachelor
Politicians awarded knighthoods